The 1903 Ohio gubernatorial election was held on November 2, 1903. Republican nominee Myron T. Herrick defeated Democratic nominee Tom L. Johnson with 54.89% of the vote.

General election

Candidates
Major party candidates
Myron T. Herrick, Republican 
Tom L. Johnson, Democratic

Other candidates
Nelson D. Creamer, Prohibition
Isaac Cowan, Socialist
John D. Goerke, Socialist Labor

Results

References

1903
Ohio
Gubernatorial